Matthew Spencer (born 17 January 1985) is a former Australian rules footballer who played for the Geelong Football Club in the Australian Football League (AFL).

Career
Spencer made his AFL-level debut with Geelong during the 2006 AFL season, performing reasonably well playing on Essendon's Scott Lucas. He managed one more game for the season before being omitted, and was subsequently delisted at the conclusion of the 2007 season, a season in which he did not play a senior match. Following the conclusion of his AFL career, Spencer returned to his former club, Swan Districts, in the West Australian Football League.

Statistics
Statistics are correct as of end of career

References

External links

Geelong Football Club players
Swan Districts Football Club players
1985 births
Living people
Australian rules footballers from Western Australia